China Electronics Technology Group Corporation, a state-owned company established in 2002 by People's Republic of China
 Chambres extraordinaires au sein des tribunaux cambodgiens, commonly known as the Khmer Rouge Tribunal, established in 1997 to prosecute genociders of the former Khmer Rouge regime
 Circulating Epithelial Tumor Cell
 Canadian Ethnic Cleansing Team, a racist hate group in Canada, prosecuted by the Canadian Human Rights Tribunal (CHRT) in 2015.